Horst aan de Maas is a municipality in the southeastern Netherlands, in the province of Limburg. In 2010 the municipalities Sevenum and part of Meerlo-Wanssum joined the municipality.

Population centres 

America, Broekhuizen, Broekhuizenvorst, Evertsoort, Griendtsveen, Grubbenvorst, Hegelsom, Horst, Kronenberg, Lottum, Meerlo, Melderslo, Meterik, Sevenum, Swolgen and Tienray.

Topography

Dutch Topographic map of the municipality of Horst aan de Maas, June 2015.

Notable people

 Frans Schraven (1873 in Lottum – 1937) a Dutch Catholic bishop who served as a missionary in China
 Hub van Doorne (1900 in America – 1979) and his brother Wim, founded DAF
 Servaas Huys (1940 in Grubbenvorst – 2016) a Dutch politician
 Jack Poels (born 1957 in America) singer, guitarist and harmonica player of Rowwen Hèze
 Peter Jenniskens (born 1962 in Horst) a Dutch and American astronomer and senior research scientist
 Twan Huys (born 1964 in Sevenum) a Dutch journalist, TV presenter and author 
 Henriëtte van Gasteren (born 1964 in Sevenum) a Dutch photographer and artist, known for her self-portraits
 Raymond Knops (born 1971 in Hegelsom) a Dutch politician
 Marijn Poels (born 1975 in Meerlo) a Dutch independent filmmaker and documentary maker 
 Mark Verheijen (born 1976 in Baarlo) a Dutch politician
 Rowwen Hèze (founded 1985) a Limburgish folk band
 Heideroosjes (active 1989-2012) punk rock band

Sport 
 Dirk Marcellis (born 1988 in Horst) a former Dutch soccerplayer with 259 club caps
 Dominique Janssen (born 1995 in Horst) Dutch soccerplayer

References

External links

Official website

 
Municipalities of Limburg (Netherlands)
Municipalities of the Netherlands established in 2001